The Alliance des jeunes patriotes pour le sursaut national ( Alliance of Young Patriots for National Survival)  commonly known as Young Patriots, of Côte d'Ivoire.

Organisation 
A youth movement supportive of the President of Côte d'Ivoire, Laurent Gbagbo and his ruling Ivorian Popular Front (FPI) party. Its founder, and current leader, is Charles Blé Goudé.

The group formed in 2002, as a wider, and more militant coalition of nationalist groups, led by Blé Goudé's Congrès Panafricain des Jeunes et des Patriotes (COJEP), which still is the dominant organization.

This new organisation incorporated:
COJEP - Blé Goudé's original organisation
la Fédération des étudiants et scolaires de Côte d'Ivoire (FESCI) - another student organization loyal to Gbagbo
The campaign to repatriate Alassane Ouattara, an Ivorian Muslim politician and opponent of Gbagbo who originally came from Burkina Faso.
Thierry Legré's "Movement for the Republican Conscience".

Directors 
The principal directors are:
 Charles Blé Goudé, Secretary-general;
 Jean-Yves Dibopieu, former Secretary-general of FESCI;
 Richard Dacoury, président de la Sorbonne;
 Idriss Ouattara, président des agoras et parlements de Côte d'Ivoire;
 Ahoua Stallone, porte-parole;
 Koné Seydou;
 Thierry Légré.

See also
Congrès Panafricain des Jeunes et des Patriotes
Charles Blé Goudé
Fédération des étudiants et scolaires de Côte d'Ivoire (FESCI)
Ivorian Civil War

References

Politics of Ivory Coast
Political organizations based in Ivory Coast